This is a list of chairpersons (speakers) of the Ntlo ya Dikgosi, an advisory body to the government of Botswana:

Sources
  Official website of the Parliament of Botswana

Botswana, Ntlo ya Dikgosi
Ntlko